Edward Harris Humphries (25 September 1914 – 27 January 1994) was an Australian politician. He was a Liberal Party member of the New South Wales Legislative Assembly from 1965 to 1971, representing the seat of Gosford. He subsequently represented the party in the New South Wales Legislative Council from 1972 to 1978. He is the grandfather of political satirist, Mark Humphries.

Notes

Members of the New South Wales Legislative Assembly
Members of the New South Wales Legislative Council
Liberal Party of Australia members of the Parliament of New South Wales
Central Coast (New South Wales)
1914 births
1994 deaths
20th-century Australian politicians